David Edwards (born March 20, 1997) is an American football guard who is a free agent. He played college football at Wisconsin.

High School career
During high school, Edwards played quarterback for Downers Grove North High School.  While in high school, he weighed 215 pounds, didn't lift weights, and didn't eat breakfast.

Edwards was also a standout basketball player for the Trojans, starting at center for three years on the varsity level. Edwards gained the attention of numerous collegiate scouts, most notably from the University of Illinois and various Ivy League schools.

College career

During college, Edwards started eating breakfast and gained 20 pounds in his first six months.  By August 2016, Edwards had grown to 275 pounds.  After his Sophomore season, Edwards was named to the AFCA First-team All-American.  Edwards considered declaring for the 2018 NFL draft, but eventually decided against it.  One factor that swayed Edwards was a talk with Wisconsin alumnus and Cleveland Browns player Joe Thomas, who told Edwards that he would remember his final year at Wisconsin more than his rookie season in the NFL.  Prior to the 2018 season, Edwards was named pre-season second-team All-American by Sporting News, Sports Illustrated, and the Associated Press.  Edwards was also named a first-team All-American by Athlon Sports.  On January 1, 2019, Edwards announced that he would forgo his final year of eligibility and declare for the 2019 NFL Draft.

Professional career

Edwards was drafted by the Los Angeles Rams in the fifth round (169th overall) of the 2019 NFL Draft. Edwards started in Super Bowl LVI and the Rams went on to defeat the Cincinnati Bengals 23-20.

Edwards returned as the starting left guard to start the 2022 season. On October 11, 2022, Edwards was placed on injured reserve with a concussion. He was designated to return from injured reserve on November 16, 2022.

References

External links
Wisconsin Badgers bio

1997 births
Living people
American football offensive tackles
Los Angeles Rams players
Wisconsin Badgers football players
People from Downers Grove, Illinois
Players of American football from Illinois
Sportspeople from DuPage County, Illinois